Only One is the third Korean studio album by the South Korean boy band Shinhwa. It was released on May 27, 2000, by SM Entertainment.  The album was delayed three months to give SM Entertainment's new group at the time, Fly to the Sky a chance to debut. The album's title song was released as the lead single, with "All Your Dreams", "First Love", and "Wedding March (Your Side)" being subsequent singles.  Only One sold 423,873 copies and reached number one on the Recording Industry Association Korea music chart.

Track listing
Information is adapted from the liner notes of Only One:

Music videos
In the music video for "Only One", the members can be seen dancing in a dark warehouse. They can be seen wearing various clothings, from black suits to only grey pants.

In the music video for "All Your Dreams", Jun Jin stars as the main lead, with the other members of Shinhwa playing various roles. It also features another SM Entertainment group, Black Beat as well as Kim Bomi.

The music video tells the story of a man (Jun Jin) and a woman (Kim Bomi) who are shown to be attracted to each other romantically.  However, another man (played by Jinyoung of Black Beat) shows romantic interest in the woman as well, thus initiating a fight between the Shinhwa and Black Beat members towards the end of the music video.

"First Love", unlike the other two, does not show Shinhwa in a choreographed dance nor portray a story. It instead features various clips of Shinhwa, from practicing their choreographies to performing in concerts.

"Wedding March", again starring Jun Jin as the main role, shows a man proposing to his love interest.

Chart performance

Release history

Personnel
Information is adapted from the liner notes of Only One:

Album production
 Lee Soo-man – producer
 KAT - recording engineer, mixing engineer
 Yeo Doo-hyeon - recording engineer, mixing engineer
 Kim Young-hoon - recording engineer, mixing engineer
 Rich Wenzel - recording engineer
 Richard S. Vick - recording engineer
 Yoo Young-jin - recording engineer, mixing engineer
 Jeon Hoon at Sonic Korea - mastering engineer

Guitar
 Groovie K - "I Wanna Be", "Only One", "All Your Dreams", "Soul"
 Sam Lee - "First Love" (electric guitar), "Cyber Love", "To My Family"
 Ji Kook-hyun - "First Love" (programming guitar)
 J-Style - "Vortex"
 Ham Choon-ho - "Wedding March"

Bass
 Lee Tae-yoon - "I Wanna Be", "First Love", "To My Family"

Violin
 Shim Sang-won - "Wedding March"
 Kim Hye-eun - "Wedding March"
 Kim Woo-hyun - "Wedding March"

References

2000 albums
Shinhwa albums
SM Entertainment albums